Ian Whitehead (born 7 January 1963) is a British luger. He competed in the men's singles event at the 1992 Winter Olympics.

References

External links
 

1963 births
Living people
British male lugers
Olympic lugers of Great Britain
Lugers at the 1992 Winter Olympics